The Outline of the Post-War New World Map was a map completed before the attack on Pearl Harbor and self-published on February 25, 1942 by Maurice Gomberg of Philadelphia, United States. It shows a proposed political division of the world after World War II in the event of an Allied victory in which the United States of America, the United Kingdom, and the Soviet Union as well as the Republic of China would rule. The map includes a manifesto describing a "New World Moral Order", along with quotes from Roosevelt's Four Freedoms speech.

Gomberg, a Polish Jewish emigre to the United States, created the map as a personal project, and little else is known of him. The map has been highlighted by New World Order conspiracy theorists who believe it represents some broader view of the US government, and has also been widely circulated online.

Description of proposed territories on map

The map proposes a total of 14 independent sovereign states, 4 military powers and 10 demilitarized states, and 3 "quarantined" states (the fate of 2 are to be eventually integrated into sovereign states).

Military powers

United States
The United States has 82 states, not including Security Outposts in the Pacific and the Atlantic, gaining all of Canada, Mexico, and Central America, among other places:

States:
Alabama - Alberta - Alaska - Arizona - Arkansas - The Bahamas - California (historical Alta (Upper) California) - Colorado - Columbia - Connecticut - Costa Rica - Cuba - Delaware - Florida - Georgia - Greenland - Guatemala (Guatemala and Belize)
- Haiti (including all of Hispaniola) - Honduras - Idaho - Illinois - Indiana - Iowa - Jamaica - Kansas - Keewatin (pre-1999 Northwest Territories east of the 110° meridian) - Kentucky - Labrador (mainland Newfoundland and Labrador) - Leeward Islands - Louisiana - Lower California (consisting of the Baja California peninsula) - Maine - Mackenzie (pre-1999 Northwest Territories west of the 110° meridian) - Manitoba - Maryland - Martinique - Massachusetts - Mexico (the remainder of Mexico) - Michigan - Minnesota - Mississippi - Missouri - Montana - Nevada - New Brunswick - Newfoundland (Island Newfoundland and Labrador) - New Hampshire - New Jersey - New Mexico - New York - Nicaragua - North Carolina - North Dakota - Nova Scotia - Ohio - Oklahoma - Ontario - Oregon - Panama - Pennsylvania - Prince Edward Island - Puerto Rico - Quebec - Rhode Island - El Salvador - Saskatchewan - South Carolina - South Dakota - Tennessee - Texas - Trinidad - Utah - Vermont - Virginia - Virgin Islands - Washington - West Virginia - Windward Islands - Wisconsin - Wyoming - Yukon

Protectorates:
- Celebes - Hainan - Halmahera Islands
- Iceland - Moluccas Islands - Commonwealth of the Philippines - Taiwan and Penghu

Port "Peace-security bases":
Dakar and Freetown on the Atlantic coast of Africa and the islands of the Pacific, excluding Solomon Islands.

British Commonwealth of Nations
The British Commonwealth of Nations is headquartered in the United Kingdom, including England (including Wales) and Scotland, but not Northern Ireland. The Commonwealth includes the Faroe Islands and the former colonies of Madagascar (in early 1942 still a Vichy French colony), Ceylon, the Andaman Islands, Cyprus, Malta, most of Indonesia (in 1942 a Dutch colony occupied by Japan; other parts are given to the US) and the current Papua New Guinea, as well as the then British colonies that are now Singapore and Malaysian Borneo, South Georgia, the Bismarck Archipelago, the Solomon Islands, and the countries of Australia and New Zealand.

Port "Peace-security bases":
Gibraltar on the southern coast of Spain,
Alexandria, Algiers, Benghazi, Oran on the Mediterranean Sea coast of Africa,
Djibouti City, Port Sudan on the Red Sea coast of Africa,
Berbera, Mogadishu and Zanzibar on the Indian coast of Africa, and
Cabinda City and Cape Town on the Atlantic coast of Africa

Soviet Union - Union of Soviet Socialist Republics
The Soviet Union would expand to be far larger than its then-current size, expanding to 24 (later 25) Soviet Socialist Republics (while downgrading preexisting SSR's to Autonomous Soviet Socialist Republics):

Soviet Socialist Republics:
Armenia - Azerbaijan - Bulgaria - Czech Republic - Estonia - Finland - Georgia - Hungary - Iran - Latvia - Lithuania - Manchuria (Heilongjiang and Hulunbuir) - Moldavia (all of Bessarabia) - Mongolia - Poland - Romania - Russia (which includes Karelia, Karakalpakstan, Kazakhstan, and Kirghizia/Kyrgyzstan) - Slovakia - Tajikistan - Turkmenistan - Ukraine - Uzbekistan - White Russia (Byelorussia) - Yugoslavia

At an unspecified later time, Germany (which includes Austria and former Polish territory formerly part of the Weimar Republic sans East Prussia). Germany is termed quarantined Germany until full integration

South America - United States of South America
Everything below the Darién Gap, and offshore islands including the Falkland Islands:

- Argentina - Bolivia - Brazil - Chile - Colombia - Ecuador - Guiana - Paraguay - Peru - Uruguay - Venezuela

Demilitarized states

China - United Republics of China
China (without Formosa or Hainan) - Inner Mongolia - Indo China (Cambodia, Laos, and Vietnam) - Korea - Malaya - Sinkiang - Thailand - Tibet

Europe - United States of Europe
Belgium (including Luxembourg) - France (including Monaco and all of Germany west of the Rhine river) - Netherlands - Portugal - San Marino (later included in Italy) - Spain (including Andorra) - Switzerland (including Liechtenstein) - Vatican City (later included in Italy)

At an unspecified later time, Italy (which is termed quarantined Italy until full integration)

Scandinavia - United States of Scandinavia
Denmark (without the Faroe Islands and Greenland) - Norway (including Spitsbergen, without Jan Mayen) - Sweden

Africa - Union of African Republics
Besides the port "peace-security bases", areas included are Algeria - Angola - Bechuanaland (Botswana) - Congo (including Burundi) - Dahomey (Benin, including Togo) - Egypt - Equatorial Africa (including Equatorial Guinea, eastern Guinea, and São Tomé and Príncipe) - Eritrea - Ethiopia (including Djibouti) - Gold Coast (Ghana) - Kenya - Liberia - Libya - Morocco - Mozambique (including southern Malawi) - Nigeria - Rhodesia (northern Malawi, Zambia, and Zimbabwe) - Senegal (including the Gambia, western Guinea, and Guinea-Bissau) - Somaliland (Somalia) - South Africa (including Lesotho and Swaziland) - South West Africa (Namibia) - Sudan - Tanganyika (including Rwanda) - Tunisia - Uganda - West Africa (including Sahrawi Arab Democratic Republic/Western Sahara and Sierra Leone, without Benin, Senegal, and Togo)

Arabia - Arabian Federated Republics
Aden (South Yemen) - Hejaz - Iraq (including Kuwait) - Lebanon - Oman (including Bahrain, Qatar, and United Arab Emirates) - Saudi Arabia - Syria - Yemen (North Yemen)

India - Federated Republics of India
Afghanistan - Balochistan - Bhutan - Burma - India (including Pakistan) - Nepal

Greece - Federal Republic of Greece
Albania - Greece

Point #24 notes the inclusion of Macedonia. that "Macedonia" is not clearly defined; the map seems to not include the modern country of that name, but rather labels Macedonia as Greek Macedonia.

Eire
Consists of the whole of the island of Ireland

Hebrewland
Includes all of modern Israel, Jordan and Palestine, taking in parts of modern Syria and a slice of northern Saudi Arabia.

Turkey
All of Asian Turkey. European Turkey would be placed under joint control of the USSR and Turkey - cf. points #27 and #28.

Quarantined nations

Nazi Germany
Mentioned as quarantined Germany, all of Weimar Republic territory east of the Rhine river but west of the former Polish Corridor, plus Austria, eventually supposed to become a full Soviet Socialist Republic in the Soviet Union

Kingdom of Italy
Mentioned as quarantined Italy, all of modern Italy and the Julian March (pre 1941), eventually supposed to become a full state in the United States of Europe

Empire of Japan
Mentioned as quarantined Japan, all of modern Japan and Iturup, Kunashir, Shikotan, Habomai (but not including Bonin Islands). Later fate presumed to be an independent democracy.

See also
New Order (Nazism)
Axis powers negotiations on the division of Asia
Alice Bailey
 The New World Order (Wells)
 Theosophical Society

References

External links
Map at the Library of Congress

Anti-German sentiment
Anti-Italian sentiment
Anti-Japanese sentiment
World maps
1942 works
Proposed countries
20th-century maps and globes